William Ratigan (1910–1984) was a Michigan (USA) based writer who is best known for his book entitled Great Lakes Shipwrecks and Survivals.  His other books include Straits of Mackinac!, Young Mr. Big, Hiawatha and America's Mightiest Mile, The Long Crossing, The Adventures of Captain McCargo and Soo Canal!.

Ratigan was born in Detroit, Michigan. He began attending the University of Detroit in 1931.

Ratigan made his home in Charlevoix, Michigan for much of his life, where he operated a small used bookstore in a fish shanty called The Dockside Press.  In his latter years, he would spend winters in Dunedin, Florida. Ratigan graduated from the University of Chattanooga (Tennessee, USA) in 1935 and was published shortly thereafter.  In 1963, he received his Ph.D. from Michigan State University in East Lansing, Michigan.  During World War II, Ratigan was employed by The National Broadcasting Company (NBC) and was named best all-around newsman in the world  by Radio Life Magazine.  Ratigan's home in Charlevoix was located at 223 Park Avenue, which was known as "Main Street" during the first part of the 20th century.

References

Author's biography on dust jacket of The Adventures of Captain McCargo.
http://charlevoixparkavenue.wordpress.com/guidebook/213-and-223-park-avenue/

1910 births
1984 deaths
20th-century American writers
People from Charlevoix, Michigan
20th-century American male writers
University of Detroit Mercy alumni
University of Tennessee at Chattanooga
Michigan State University alumni